The Lighthouse by the Sea is a 1924 American silent adventure film produced by and distributed by Warner Bros. The film's star is canine sensation Rin Tin Tin, the most famous animal actor of the 1920s. The film was directed by Malcolm St. Clair.

Plot
As described in a review in a film magazine, shipwrecked off the coast of Maine, young Belgian Albert Dorn (Collier) would have perished from exposure and the difficulties he encountered were it not for his dog Rin Tin Tin. When their little boat finally drifts to the shore, Flora Gale (Fazenda), daughter of the lighthouse keeper Caleb (Mailes), rescues Albert. She has the job of keeping the light as the old man has gone blind and is worried that he will lose his job if this becomes known. Bootleggers operating in the vicinity scheme to extinguish the light on a certain night when they will discharge their cargo. They kidnap Albert, tying him up, and put a net around Rin Tin Tin, taking them out to the ship, and then fell the old man and put out the light. Rin Tin Tin chews his way out of the net, and then gnaws the ropes that bind Albert. After battling the crew, they make their way to shore. Edward Cavanna (Gerrard), leader of the bootleggers, and his pal Joe Dagget (Betz) chain Albert, but he succeeds in setting fire to some waste so Rin Tin Tin can dash up the lighthouse with the burning waste, drop it into the light, and starting it again. Flora has been kidnapped and taken to the boat. The old man frees Albert, and he and Rin Tin Tin get aboard the boat. They are battling to rescue Flora when a revenue cutter captures the ship. Albert finds happiness in Flora's love.

Cast

Box Office
According to Warner Bros records the film earned $284,000 domestically and $46,000 in foreign markets.

Preservation
The Lighthouse by the Sea survives today, with a print in the Library of Congress and several film archives around the world. It was transferred onto 16mm film by Associated Artists Productions in the 1950s and shown on television. It has also been issued on DVD.

For her 13th Birthday, the Jewish diarist Anne Frank watched this film from a rented reel with an early projection machine along with her friends who thoroughly enjoyed it. Anne was a big fan of Rin Tin Tin and mentioned this film in her diary.

See also
 Rin Tin Tin

References

External links

Review and stills at silentsaregolden.com

1924 films
American silent feature films
American films based on plays
Films directed by Malcolm St. Clair
Warner Bros. films
American black-and-white films
American adventure films
1924 adventure films
Rin Tin Tin
Films about blind people
1920s American films
Silent adventure films